Ji–Xu Xiang (吉漵片), also known as Chen–Xu (辰溆片), is a Xiang Chinese language spoken in western Hunan that does not fit into the traditional New Xiang–Old Xiang dichotomy. It is geographically separated from the New Xiang dialects that it was traditionally grouped with.

Dialects
In the Language Atlas of China (1987), Xiang was divided into three subgroups.
Their Ji-Xu subgroup comprised varieties spoken in the counties of Chenxi, Xupu, Luxi, Jishou, Baojing, Huayuan, Guzhang and Yuanling.
Bao and Chen (2005) identified five subgroups of Xiang.  Their Chen-Xu subgroup included varieties spoken in Chenxi, Xupu, Luxi, with the rest of the Atlas's Ji-Xu subgroup classified as Southwest Mandarin dialects.

References 

Xiang Chinese